The 2018 Suwon JS Cup is an international football friendly tournament. The tournament was used to prepare the host organisers for the 2018 AFC U-19 Championship in South Korea.

References 

International association football competitions hosted by South Korea